Christian Jakob Kraus (27 July 1753 – 25 August 1807) was a German comparative and historical linguist.

Biography
A native of Osterode (East Prussia), Kraus studied at the universities of Königsberg and Göttingen. In 1782 he became a professor of practical philosophy and cameralism in Königsberg. A student of Immanuel Kant, Kraus was famous for importing the ideas of Adam Smith into the German academic scene. He was also a librarian of the Königsberg Public Library from 1786 to 1804. Kraus encouraged the East Prussian officials and nobility to improve rural conditions in the province; some of his ideas were later adapted in the era of Prussian reforms. Kraus died in Königsberg in 1807.

Notes

References

1753 births
1807 deaths
German librarians
Linguists from Germany
People from Ostróda
People from East Prussia
University of Göttingen alumni
University of Königsberg alumni
Academic staff of the University of Königsberg
Cameralists